Colonel Frederick Robertson Aikman VC (6 February 1828 – 5 October 1888) was a Scottish recipient of the Victoria Cross, the highest and most prestigious award for gallantry in the face of the enemy that can be awarded to British and Commonwealth forces.

Early life
Aikman was born on 6 February 1828, and later baptised on 4 May. He was the son of Captain George Robertson Aikman, and decided to follow his father into military service.

Military career
Aikman joined the Bengal Army, and went on to serve for eighteen years. He fought in the First Anglo-Sikh War, including being present at the Battle of Sobraon. During the Second Anglo-Sikh War, he was assigned to Major-General Hugh Wheeler's forces until the Indian Rebellion of 1857. During that war, he fought in a number of battles including the Siege of Delhi and the Capture of Lucknow.

At the age of 30 years, and while a lieutenant in the 4th Bengal Native Infantry, Bengal Army during the Indian Mutiny when the following deed took place on 1 March 1858 near Amethi, India, for which he was awarded the VC:

He retired from the amy on half pay due to the injury he sustained in the Victoria Cross action. On 4 March 1862, Aikman married Louisa Grace Hargreaves at St. Stephen's, Paddington.

He was appointed a member of The Honourable Corps of Gentlemen at Arms, the Queen's official bodyguard, on 13 May 1865, having been nominated by Lord Thomas Foley. While a member of the Guard, he was charged with being drunk and disorderly while in charge of four horses and a coach. He and a group of his friends and servants had been returned from a trip to the Epsom Races when he was arrested after driving recklessly. In 1871 he became Lieutenant-Colonel Commandant of the part-time Royal East Middlesex Militia.

Aikman was one of the jurers in Tichborne v. Lushington.

Death and legacy
Aikman was one of 55 men awarded the Victoria Cross who were painted by Louis Desanges between 1859 and 1862. These paintings went on display at the Crystal Palace in the 1860s and 70s. Aikman's painting is now owned by and stored in the National Army Museum. Their collection also holds a second painting of Aikman; a portrait by Captain George Agnew Goldinham which was created around 1860. There are four photographic portraits of Aikman held by the National Portrait Gallery.

Colonel Aikman, died suddenly on 5 October 1888 during the County Ball at Hamilton, Lanarkshire. He is buried in Kensal Green Cemetery in London. He remained one of the Queen's Bodyguard until his death.

References

External links

British recipients of the Victoria Cross
Indian Rebellion of 1857 recipients of the Victoria Cross
British Indian Army officers
British East India Company Army officers
1828 births
1888 deaths
Burials at Kensal Green Cemetery
People from South Lanarkshire
British military personnel of the First Anglo-Sikh War
British military personnel of the Second Anglo-Sikh War
Honourable Corps of Gentlemen at Arms
Middlesex Militia officers
British people in colonial India